The Perak forest skink or starry forest skink (Sphenomorphus annamiticus)  is a species of skink found in Vietnam and Cambodia.

References

annamiticus
Reptiles described in 1901
Taxa named by Oskar Boettger
Reptiles of Cambodia
Reptiles of Vietnam